Patrick Joseph Higgins (born November 11, 1963) is an American football coach and former player. Higgins currently works as an employee with the NCAA with the enforcement football group. He is the former offensive coordinator for the UTEP Miners football team. He was the interim head coach for Purdue University during the 2013 Heart of Dallas Bowl.

Head coaching record

References

1963 births
Living people
American football defensive backs
American football quarterbacks
BYU Cougars football coaches
Columbia Lions football coaches
Louisiana Tech Bulldogs football coaches
People from Pendleton, New York
Purdue Boilermakers football coaches
Quincy Hawks football coaches
Shepherd Rams football coaches
St. Cloud State Huskies football coaches
UTEP Miners football coaches
William Penn Statesmen football coaches
William Penn Statesmen football players
High school football coaches in Georgia (U.S. state)